Southmead Hospital is a large public National Health Service hospital, situated in the area of Southmead, though in Horfield ward, in the northern suburbs of Bristol, England. It is part of the North Bristol NHS Trust. The 800-bed Brunel Building opened in May 2014, to provide services (including Accident and Emergency), which transferred from Frenchay Hospital in advance of its closure.

History

Early history
The hospital originated in 1902, when the Barton Regis Poor Law Union opened a new workhouse.  The Barton Regis Union had been obliged to open a new workhouse when it lost its urban areas, and with them its workhouse at Eastville, to Bristol in 1897.  An innovation in the new workhouse at Southmead was that in a separate building it included an infirmary, with 28 beds for the sick and provision for three nurses. 

By 1911, there were 520 beds. During the First World War, the Memorial Wing at Bristol Royal Infirmary together with Southmead Hospital were requisitioned by the War Office to create the 2nd Southern General Hospital, a facility for the Royal Army Medical Corps to treat military casualties. The facilities reverted to a workhouse in the early 1920s and were then greatly extended to accommodate all the sick. In 1924, the Southmead Infirmary was built and was later renamed Southmead Hospital. Notable former medical staff include Geoffrey Tovey, serologist and founder of the UK Transplant Service, which was formed in 1972 and was initially based at the hospital.

Brunel building
In 2005, a major expansion was planned which included moving most services from Frenchay Hospital to the Southmead site, with Frenchay being downgraded to a Community Hospital. Full approval for the project was given by the NHS South West board in January 2009. A new building, which was designed by the Building Design Partnership and built by Carillion at a cost of £430 million, was procured under a Private Finance Initiative contract in 2010. The scheme brought all departments and services together under one roof. Called the Brunel building, after Bristol engineer Isambard Kingdom Brunel, it would have 800 beds, 24 operating theatres, patient gardens, a public square, a helipad and visitors' multi-storey car park.

The accident and emergency department at Frenchay closed on 19 May 2014 and reopened at Southmead the next day.

In early 2014, the second phase of the hospital redevelopment began with the demolition of the old main building to enable construction work to begin on a Brunel Building extension, together with enlarging the area in front of the hospital. The extension includes a new multi-storey car park for patients and visitors, a cycle centre with storage for 300 bikes, more shops, changing and shower facilities for staff and a community arts space.

Following the 2014 opening of the Brunel building, there was a shortage of parking spaces owing to high demands from visitors, patients, and staff. In 2014 and 2015, patients and visitors parked at the nearby Beaufort Way multi-storey car park. Improvements were made in 2016, including the construction of a 400-space multi-storey car park next to the Brunel building.

Archives
Records relating to hospitals within the Southmead Health Authority are held at Bristol Archives (Ref. 39880).

See also
Healthcare in Bristol
Bristol Royal Hospital for Children
List of hospitals in England

References

External links

Hospital buildings completed in 2014
Hospitals in Bristol
NHS hospitals in England
Teaching hospitals in England
1902 establishments in England
Poor law infirmaries
Military hospitals in the United Kingdom
Southmead